Patrycja Wyciszkiewicz (born 8 January 1994) is a Polish sprinter specialising in the 400 metres. She competed in the 4 × 400 m relay event at the 2012 Summer Olympics.

International competitions

References

External links

People from Śrem
Polish female sprinters
1994 births
Living people
Olympic athletes of Poland
Athletes (track and field) at the 2012 Summer Olympics
Athletes (track and field) at the 2016 Summer Olympics
Sportspeople from Greater Poland Voivodeship
World Athletics Championships athletes for Poland
World Athletics Championships medalists
Universiade medalists in athletics (track and field)
Universiade gold medalists for Poland
World Athletics Indoor Championships medalists
Medalists at the 2017 Summer Universiade
Olympic female sprinters